Trevor Boyd (born 22 October 1944) is an Australian cricketer. He played four first-class matches for New South Wales between 1966/67 and 1969/70.

See also
 List of New South Wales representative cricketers

References

External links
 

1944 births
Living people
Australian cricketers
New South Wales cricketers